You Are an Artist is a television series, which first aired on NBC flagship station WNBT-TV in New York City and "a small network of stations on the East Coast" on May 13, 1946, and then continued on the NBC Television network until 1950.

Versions

You Are an Artist
As its title suggests, it was a program designed to teach people how to draw. Artist Jon Gnagy "would execute drawings before the camera while describing his technique in simple, understandable language." In later episodes, he added analysis of a famous painting on each episode.

The program briefly reverted to a New York City local show before a final three-week run on NBC in 1950.

The Warren Hull Show
Warren Hull became host of the program in January 1950, and the title changed to reflect his role as star. The format changed to a talk show, "nothing more than an extended commercial for its sponsors, the book publishers Doubleday and Company." In each episode, Hull talked about a new book from Doubleday and interviewed the author. Hull was host for a month, before Ben Grauer replaced him.

The Ben Grauer Show
Once more, the title was changed to indicate a new host. Grauer continued Hull's format of talking about books and interviewing authors. His program also plugged Doubleday book clubs that offered discounted versions of books. Grauer's version of the show ran from February 1950 through June 1950.

Episode status
No complete kinescoped episodes are known to survive of this program, due to NBC's lack of an archival policy at the time. However, a small segment without sound survives on a test reel of programs made by Hubert Chain in 1947 as recorded from the TV screen.  This reel is in the Library of Congress archives.  There are also numerous audio recordings without video images from as early as January 9, 1947 (featuring Jon Gnagy) as taken from the live WNBT-TV broadcasts in New York, as documented in the Library of Congress SONIC Archives.

See also
1946-47 United States network television schedule (Fridays at 8:15pm ET, 15 minutes)
1947-48 United States network television schedule (Thursdays at 9pm ET, 15 minutes)
1948-49 United States network television schedule (Wednesdays at 7:30pm ET, 20 minutes)

References

External links
 

1946 American television series debuts
1950 American television series endings
Arts and crafts television series
NBC original programming
Black-and-white American television shows
English-language television shows